WBSC may refer to:

International organizations
 World Baseball Softball Confederation, the world governing body for the sports of baseball, softball and Baseball5
 World Buddhist Sangha Council, a Buddhist ecumenical organization

Radio and television
 WBSC (AM), a defunct radio station (1550 AM) formerly licensed to serve Bennettsville, South Carolina, United States 
 WBSC-LP, a low-power radio station (102.3 FM) licensed to serve Bamberg, South Carolina, United States
 WMYA-TV, a television station (channel 35, virtual 40) licensed to Anderson, South Carolina, United States, which used the call sign WBSC-TV from September 1999 to June 2006